Lee Johnson (born December 13, 1997) is an American professional wrestler currently signed to All Elite Wrestling (AEW). He is a member of The Factory alongside Cole Karter, Nick Comoroto, Aaron Solo, and QT Marshall.

References

External links
 

1997 births
Living people
21st-century professional wrestlers
American male professional wrestlers
All Elite Wrestling personnel
Professional wrestlers from Indiana
Sportspeople from Gary, Indiana